Horsh Beirut is an urban park in the heart of the capital of Lebanon, Beirut. The urban park is also known as Horsh El Snaubar ( or ).

History 

In the 13th century, William of Tyre (or ), the medieval prelate, chronicler and the archbishop of Tyre, named the forest of Beirut, as "La Pinée" or "Sapinoie".

The park, Horsh, has suffered throughout history from frequent abuse of its timber especially by the armies of the Crusaders, Mamluks, Ottomans, and the Allies of World War II to build ships and weapons. Large parts of the pine forest were segmented-out to become an Ottoman Casino in 1917 (which became the Pine Residence later during the French Mandate of Lebanon), a horse racecourse in 1921, Al-Shohadaa Cemetery in 1958, and Rawdat al-Shaheedein Cemetery in the 1970s. Moreover, the development of new roads during the 1950s state planning produced some leftovers of the remaining woodland that became subject to conflict and appropriation.

Horsh was bombed to burn by Israeli jet fighters during the 1982 Israeli invasion of Lebanon. Much of it was also turned into a Palestinian refugee camp. From a pine forest over 1,250,000 m2 in 1696 it decreased to a park over 800,000 m2 in 1967 (≈ 5% of Municipal Beirut),

Today, Horsh Beirut is a  triangular park at the southern border of the city limited by Omar Beyhum Street, 22 November Avenue, Abdelnasser Avenue and National Museum of Beirut (Musée national de Beyrouth).

It lies along the axis of the old airport road amidst areas of Mazraa, Tarik el-Jdideh, Qasqas, Sabra, Ghobeyri, Shiyah, Furn el-Shebak, and Badaro while it is separated from Ras el-Nabaa by the Beirut Hippodrome.

The park, or Horsh Beirut, has been reconstructed after the end of the Lebanese Civil War and it has been closed for the general public for about 25 years. Lebanese citizens had to apply for a permission and only have chances to get one if they are older than 35 years. At the same time there have been reports of Western foreigners getting permission while applications by Lebanese were rejected. Beirut residents have repeatedly protested against the denial of access to the park including the unequal access policies for Western and non-Western park visitors. However, it ended up being reopened to the public by the governor of Beirut, Ziad Chebib, on September 3, 2015, in what was considered a victory for civil society after constantly demanding its reopening to all Lebanese citizens.

Image gallery

References 

 Al-Wali, T. (1993). Beirut fi'Tarikh wal'Hadara wal'Omran (Beirut: History, Culture, and Urbanism). Beirut: Dar al-Elem lil'Malayeen.

External links
Aerial photograph

Gardens in Lebanon
Parks in Lebanon
Urban public parks
Parks and gardens in Beirut